The Estonia national rugby union team is governed by the Estonian Rugby Union, which oversees all rugby union in Estonia. As of October 2014 they have played only a handful of matches, but have qualified for the 2014–16 European Nations Cup Third Division. The current stadium used by the national team is Viimsi Staadion.

History
A combined Estonia/Latvia side took on a Swedish representative side in the late 1990s, but a proper national team only started playing in August 2009, touring England and playing two matches, losing both. They came up against Kent club Tonbridge Juddians in their first match, coming out at the wrong end of a 94–7 scoreline. The Juddians gave them a rather torrid time in the scrums, which was probably influenced by the fact that the Estonians only had their first-ever scrum machine session on the morning of the match. The second fixture saw them square off against England Deaf at Folkestone, this time managing to keep the score to a respectable 21–27.

Estonia have since played several matches as they have built up their team. They were defeated by the Welsh national deaf team in Tallinn, losing 93–3 in June 2012, with closer defeats to Finland, Finland 'A' and Turkey.

Estonia obtained their first win a play-off match for a position in the 2014–16 European Nations Cup Third Division, defeating Belarus 59–12.

Record

Overall

Squad for the 2016 European Nations Cup
Ragnar Toompere
Taavi Ermel
Mamukel Gorelashvili
Ashwath Venkatasubramanian
Lauri Laaniste
Rasmus Toompere
Mihkel Parn
Kaarel Kokemagi
Jaan Lorens
Karmo Lomp
Pedro Gallardo
Andre Astre
Kimmo Kokemagi
Kullar Veersalu
Rob Kalso
Marvin Uurike
Chris Wallace
Luke Veebel
Aivar Lohmus
Eerik Oja
Kristjan Kotkas
Karl Pallas

See also
Rugby union in Estonia
Estonian Rugby Union

References

External links
 Estonian Rugby Union official site
 Estonian Rugby on Facebook
 Estonian Rugby on Instagram
 Rugby.ee

European national rugby union teams
Rugby
Teams in European Nations Cup (rugby union)
Rugby union in Estonia